The discography of Nas, an American rapper, consists of fifteen studio albums, one collaborative album, one group album, five compilations, four mixtapes, one extended play, and seventy-nine singles (including twelve collaboration singles and thirty-three as a featured artist). The son of jazz musician Olu Dara, Nas dropped out of school during ninth grade and began his music career in 1991 with a guest performance on the song "Live at the Barbeque" by Main Source. In 1992, Nas featured on the MC Serch posse cut, “Back to the Grill”, alongside Chubb Rock and Red Hot Lover Tone, and later contributed the track, "Halftime" to the soundtrack to the film, Zebrahead. Soon Nas ignited enough hype and signed to Columbia Records, where he released his debut album Illmatic in 1994. Including Nas's solo debut track "Halftime", Illmatic was certified double platinum in the US, spawned several singles including "It Ain't Hard to Tell" and "The World Is Yours", and earned much critical acclaim. With a more mainstream-oriented sound, Nas's second album It Was Written was released in 1996 and included the Lauryn Hill collaboration "If I Ruled the World (Imagine That)" and "Street Dreams", the latter of which reached number 22 on the Billboard Hot 100 chart and number 1 on the Hot Rap Singles chart. It Was Written was certified triple platinum. In 1999, Nas released two albums: I Am... and Nastradamus. While I Am reached double platinum status like its preceding album It Was Written and spawned two singles that reached the top ten spots of the Hot Rap Singles chart, "Hate Me Now" and "Nas Is Like", Nastradamus signaled a decrease in quality and critical reception and sold only half as many units. Still, Nastradamus featured two charting singles, "You Owe Me", "Nastradamus" and was certified platinum .

After another New York City rapper, Jay-Z, attacked Nas in his album The Blueprint, Nas released Stillmatic in 2001 with a track responding to Jay-Z's attack along with two singles that once again made the top ten spots of the Billboard rap chart, "Got Ur Self A..." and "One Mic". Nas's 2002 album God's Son included "I Can", his most successful single on the Hot 100 that charted at number 12 there. However, Nas's 2004 album Street's Disciple failed to attract much hype. After Nas settled his feud with Jay-Z by performing with Jay-Z in the rival rapper's "I Declare War" concert in October 2005, Nas was signed to Def Jam Recordings Def Jam label in 2006 and debuted on Def Jam with Hip Hop Is Dead, his third album to reach number 1 on the American Billboard 200 album chart. In 2008, Nas released an untitled album that he controversially almost titled Nigger.

Nas has also participated in three non-solo albums. In 1997, he teamed up with rappers AZ, Cormega, Foxy Brown, and Nature to form supergroup The Firm, whose self-titled album reached the top of the Billboard 200 and included two modestly charting singles "Firm Biz" and "Phone Tap". With his new imprint Ill Will Records, Nas released in 2000 the collaborative compilation Nas & Ill Will Records Presents QB's Finest, which included "Da Bridge 2001" and "Oochie Wally". A few mixtapes were released, as well. In 2010, Nas and reggae singer Damian Marley released the collaborative studio album Distant Relatives. Among the singles in which Nas did guest performances, four of them reached the top ten of the Hot 100: "Hot Boyz" by Missy Elliott (whose remix also featured Lil' Mo, Eve, and Q-Tip), "Did You Ever Think" by R. Kelly, "Thank God I Found You (Make It Last Remix)" by Mariah Carey and "I'm Gonna Be Alright" by Jennifer Lopez. Nas also appeared in singles and tracks by his ex-wife Kelis, Sean Combs, The Game, Ludacris, and Mobb Deep among others. Nas has sold over 15 million records in the United States alone.

Albums

Studio albums

Compilation albums

Mixtapes

Group albums

Collaborative albums

EPs

DVDs

Singles

As lead artist

Collaboration singles

As featured artist

Promotional singles

Other charted or certified songs

Guest appearances

Production discography

Music videos

As lead artist

As featured artist

Notes

References

External links

Hip hop discographies
Discographies of American artists
Discography